Puppy Dome is a granite dome in Tuolumne Meadows, Yosemite National Park, California.

Location

Puppy Dome is south of Lembert Dome, and southwest of Moraine Flat. Puppy Dome is across from Lembert Dome.

By standards in Tuolumne, Puppy Dome is of the smallest domes in Yosemite National Park, next to much larger Lembert Dome.

Near the base of Puppy Dome is Puppy Dome Falls, on the Dana Fork of the Tuolumne River.

Puppy Dome is small, but from its top, you get an unobstructed view of Tuolumne Meadows. East, you can see Tioga Pass and Mount Dana. West, you can see Cathedral Peak and to the north, Lembert Dome.

Getting to Puppy Dome

Puppy Dome is close to Tuolumne Meadows's road and parking lot, with a 5-minute approach.

Walking up Puppy Dome

One may walk up Puppy Dome by walking moderately-angled rock slabs of the east face. Going up, they seem easy, comfortable, but be sure to descend carefully, as if you slip, you may not be able to stop. Make sure you have proper shoes; test your ability to walk on these slabs by going up and down the first few feet before committing to the entire climb.

Rock climbing

Some good beginner routes are on the easier low angled face, and several harder routes are around the far side of the dome; there is an overhanging face.

References

External links and references

 peakbagger.com on Puppy Dome
 A map
 A YouTube video, on rock climbing
 A YouTube video, on rock climbing
 A YouTube video, of the waterfall by Puppy Dome
 A google map

Granite domes of Yosemite National Park